Le Jeu du Roi ("the king's game") is a 1976 novel by the French writer Jean Raspail. It focuses on the subject of the Kingdom of Araucanía and Patagonia. It was published by éditions Robert Laffont.

Adaptation
The novel was the basis for the 1988 film Letter from Patagonia. The film was directed by Marc Evans and stars Pierre Dux.

References

External links
 Le Jeu du Roi at the author's website 

1976 French novels
French novels adapted into films
French-language novels
Novels by Jean Raspail